Finn Gehrsitz (born 25 September 2004) is a German racing driver currently competing in the European Le Mans Series for United Autosports.

Career

2020 
Having been slated to make his car racing debut in the Lamera Cup at Misano in 2020, Gehrsitz instead debuted in the Porsche Super Sports Cup at the Hockenheimring owing to the effects of the COVID-19 pandemic on the racing schedule. He started his career out in brilliant fashion, winning his first two races in GT4 machinery. At the GTC Finale held at the same circuit in November, Gehrsitz finished the endurance race in third, before being disqualified for an operational error, before winning the sprint race.

2021 
For the 2021 season, Gehrsitz would move to compete in the Michelin Le Mans Cup, driving in the LMP3 category for Phoenix Racing. Partnering Hamza Owega, the German would qualify second for the opening two races, scoring a seventh and fourth place in the races, before taking his first pole position at Monza. He made good use of his grid spot, remaining in first before handing over the car to Owega at the midway point of the race, before their car suffered a mechanical issue, forcing them to retire. Another pole followed at the penultimate round in Spa-Francorchamps, where the team finished fourth, before Gehrsitz missed the season finale, meaning he dropped to ninth in the standings by season's end.

At the end of the year, Gehrsitz made his debut in the European Le Mans Series, driving for Eurointernational in the season finale at Portimão.

2022 
Gehrsitz competed in the Asian Le Mans Series at the start of 2022. Driving alongside Jürgen Häring and Marco Seefried in the GT-Am class, the team took four podiums and ended up third in the championship.

His main campaign would lie in the European Le Mans Series, where he raced for United Autosports in the LMP3 class alongside Bailey Voisin and Josh Caygill. His season started out strongly, as, having run first during his stint, teammate Caygill finished the race in Le Castellet in third, which turned into second once a car ahead had been disqualified. The following rounds would bring less success however, as two retirements sandwiched a fifth and ninth place. At the season finale in the Algarve, Gehrsitz and his teammates took another podium finish, leading them to take eighth in the drivers' standings.

Following the end of the campaign, Gehrsitz was selected as one of the designated Rookie Test drivers for the post-season rookie test in the World Endurance Championship. The German drove in the LMGTE - Am category.

Personal life 
Gehrsitz is mentored by Ellen Lohr, the only woman to ever win a race in the DTM.

Karting record

Karting career summary

Racing record

Racing career summary 

* Season still in progress.

Complete Le Mans Cup results
(key) (Races in bold indicate pole position) (Races in italics indicate fastest lap)

Complete European Le Mans Series results 
(key) (Races in bold indicate pole position; results in italics indicate fastest lap)

References

External links 

 

2004 births
Living people
German racing drivers
European Le Mans Series drivers
Asian Le Mans Series drivers
Phoenix Racing drivers
EuroInternational drivers
United Autosports drivers
Sportspeople from Stuttgart
Le Mans Cup drivers